Savitramma Gari Abbayi is an Indian Telugu-language television drama series airing on Star Maa from 11 March 2019 and ended on 28 August 2021. It is the remake of the StarJalsha's Bengali soap opera Khokababu. It stars Chandan Kumar and Ayesha.

Plot 
Balaraju, a young handsome wrestler and the most eligible bachelor in the village. While he can easily make women go weak in the knees and has a good female fan base to boast about too, he is hobbled by his word to his mother.

Cast

Main 

 Chandan Kumar (Episode 1 - 520) as Balaraju 
 Baladitya (Episode 522 - 645) as Balaraju (After Plastic Surgery), Savitramma's son  and Nnadhini's Husband/ Gaaliraju, the Pickpocketer (died) (Dual Role)
 Ayesha (Episode 1 - 275) as Nandini 
 Supritha Sathyanarayan (Episode 278 - 302) (after face transplant) (Replaced Ayesha) as Nandini → Durga Gade (Episode 303 - 645) (Replaced Supritha) as Nandini, Balaraju's wife and Savitramma's Daughter in law
Nisha shashidhar as Nandhini aka Bujjamma
 Haritha as Savitramma, Balaraju's mother
 Siri Hanmanth as Myna (Died)

Adaptations

Reception 
The series received good reviews and was later dubbed in Kannada as S/O Savitramma

References

External links 

  on Hotstar

Indian television series
Indian television soap operas
Serial drama television series
2019 Indian television series debuts
Telugu-language television shows
Indian drama television series
Star Maa original programming
Television shows set in Andhra Pradesh